Herrera v. Collins, 506 U.S. 390 (1993), was a case in which the Supreme Court of the United States ruled by 6 votes to 3 that a claim of actual innocence does not entitle a petitioner to federal habeas corpus relief by way of the Eighth Amendment's ban on cruel and unusual punishment.

Background

On September 29, 1981, Texas Department of Public Safety Officer David Rucker was shot and killed along a stretch of highway a few miles north of Brownsville, Texas in the Rio Grande Valley. Rucker's body, discovered by a passerby, was lying beside his patrol car. He had been shot in the head. Around the same time, Los Fresnos police officer Enrique Carrisalez observed a speeding vehicle traveling on the same road away from where Rucker's body had been found. Carrisalez and his civilian friend, Enrique Hernandez, turned on the patrol car's flashing red lights and pursued the vehicle, which pulled over. Carrisalez took a flashlight and walked toward the car. The driver of the vehicle opened his door and exchanged words with Carrisalez before firing at least one shot at Carrisalez's chest. He died eight days later on October 7, 1981. Former U.S. Navy and Vietnam veteran Leonel Torres Herrera (September 17, 1947 – May 12, 1993) was arrested and was charged with the capital murder of both Carrisalez and Rucker.

Before he died, Carrisalez also identified Herrera as the person who shot him from a single photograph shown to him in the hospital. The license plate of the vehicle from which the gunman emerged was traced back to Herrera's live-in girlfriend, a car that local law officers knew Herrera drove on occasion. Carrisalez's civilian friend, Enrique Hernandez, testified that only one person was in the car when Carrisalez was shot.

Other evidence showed that Herrera's Social Security card had been found alongside Rucker's patrol car on the night he was killed. Splatters of blood on the car identified by Carrisalez's friend as the vehicle involved in the shootings were found to be type A blood, the same as Rucker's. Blood on Herrera's pants and wallet was likewise discovered to be type A. Last, a handwritten letter was found on Herrera when he was arrested which "strongly implied" that he had killed Rucker.

Herrera became the prime suspect in Hidalgo County - Precinct 3 Deputy Constable Ricky Lewis's murder on February 17, 1979, after law enforcement found Constable Lewis's stolen duty weapon during a search of Herrera's home. However, he was never charged with Constable Lewis's murder because he was only convicted of Officers Rucker and Carrisalez's murders.

Trial

In January 1982, Herrera was tried for the murder of Carrisalez.  At the trial, Carrisalez' partner identified Herrera as the person who shot Carrisalez.  The jury found Herrera guilty of the capital murder of Carrisalez, for which he was sentenced to death. Later that year, Herrera pleaded guilty to the murder of Rucker.

Writ of habeas corpus
Herrera filed a petition for writ of habeas corpus in federal court, claiming that new evidence demonstrated he was actually innocent of the murder of Carrisalez.  Herrera included two affidavits with his petition from Hector Villarreal, an attorney who had represented Herrera's brother, Raul Herrera, Sr., and Juan Franco Palacious, Raul Herrera's former cellmate. Both affidavits claimed that Raul Herrera, who was murdered in 1984, had told them that he had killed Rucker and Carrisalez.  Leonel Herrera claimed that the new evidence showed that he was actually innocent, and that executing an innocent person would constitute cruel and unusual punishment in violation of the Eighth Amendment.

The decision

Two questions were presented for the Supreme Court's review:

 Do the Eighth and Fourteenth Amendments permit a state to execute an individual who is innocent of the crime for which he or she was convicted and sentenced to death?
What post-conviction procedures are necessary to protect against the execution of an innocent person?

Rehnquist's majority opinion
Chief Justice William Rehnquist’s majority opinion held that a claim of actual innocence based on newly discovered evidence did not state a ground for federal habeas relief.  Herrera had claimed that, because the new evidence demonstrated innocence, his execution would violate the Eighth Amendment’s ban on cruel and unusual punishment which applied to the states through the Fourteenth Amendment.  Rehnquist’s opinion noted that “[f]ew rulings would be more disruptive of our federal system than to provide for federal habeas review of freestanding claims of actual innocence.” Rehnquist’s opinion, although not explicitly holding that the Eighth Amendment does not prohibit executing an innocent person, emphasized that Herrera was not raising a constitutional violation.  In discussing what relief Herrera would be entitled to were he to succeed on his claim of “actual innocence,” Rehnquist wrote:

Were petitioner to satisfy the dissent's ‘probable innocence’ standard…the District Court would presumably be required to grant a conditional order of relief, which would in effect require the State to retry petitioner 10 years after his first trial, not because of any constitutional violation which had occurred at the first trial, but simply because of a belief that in light of petitioner's new-found evidence a jury might find him not guilty at a second trial.

Rehnquist’s opinion also held that Texas courts’ refusal to even consider Herrera’s newly discovered evidence did not violate due process and suggested that Herrera file a clemency petition with the Texas Board of Pardon and Paroles.

O'Connor's concurring opinion
Justice O'Connor wrote a concurring opinion.  Although she joined the majority opinion, in her concurring opinion, O'Connor wrote that "the execution of a legally and factually innocent person would be a constitutionally intolerable event."  Dispositive for Justice O'Connor, however, was that "[Herrera was] not innocent in any sense of the word."  O'Connor took the position that Herrera could not be "legally and factually innocent" because he "was tried before a jury of his peers, with the full panoply of protections that our Constitution affords criminal defendants. At the conclusion of that trial, the jury found [Herrera] guilty beyond a reasonable doubt."  O'Connor reiterated the majority's conclusion that the execution of an innocent person was not unconstitutional by assuming that there was no constitutional issue raised:

Consequently, the issue before us is not whether a State can execute the innocent. It is, as the Court notes, whether a fairly convicted and therefore legally guilty person is constitutionally entitled to yet another judicial proceeding in which to adjudicate his guilt anew, 10 years after conviction, notwithstanding his failure to demonstrate that constitutional error infected his trial.

O'Connor concluded by asserting that the majority did not hold that the Constitution permits the execution of an actually innocent person.

Scalia's concurring opinion
Antonin Scalia joined the majority, but added in passing that he found no basis, either in the Constitution or in case law, to conclude that executing an innocent but duly convicted defendant would violate the Eighth Amendment. He sharply criticized the dissenting justices' appeal to conscience:

If the system that has been in place for 200 years (and remains widely approved) "shocks" the dissenters' consciences … perhaps they should doubt the calibration of their consciences, or, better still, the usefulness of "conscience shocking" as a legal test.

Blackmun's dissent

Justice Blackmun, joined by Justices Stevens and Souter, dissented.  Blackmun believed that "[n]othing could be more contrary to contemporary standards of decency or more shocking to the conscience than to execute a person who is actually innocent."  Blackmun would have remanded the case to the district court for a determination as to whether a hearing should be held and to resolve the merits of Herrera's claim of actual innocence.

Chastising the majority for its circumspection, Blackmun wrote, "We really are being asked to decide whether the Constitution forbids the execution of a person who has been validly convicted and sentenced, but who, nonetheless, can prove his innocence with newly discovered evidence," and he took note of "the State of Texas' astonishing protestation to the contrary."

Blackmun argued that the majority's concern with a new trial being less reliable than the original trial missed the point.  The question was not whether a new trial would be more reliable than the first trial; it was whether, in light of the new evidence, the first trial was sufficiently reliable to allow the State to execute Herrera.  Blackmun would have held that in order to be entitled to relief, a death-sentenced inmate should have to be able to demonstrate that he is probably actually innocent; Blackmun distinguished this from the lower standard of probable reasonable doubt, which is applied to procedural default issues.

Subsequent history

Four months after the Court's ruling, Herrera was executed.  His last words were: "I am innocent, innocent, innocent. . . . I am an innocent man, and something very wrong is taking place tonight."

See also
 List of people executed in Texas, 1990–1999
 List of United States Supreme Court cases, volume 506

References

External links
 

False justice
Executing the Innocent

United States Supreme Court cases
United States Supreme Court cases of the Rehnquist Court
Cruel and Unusual Punishment Clause and death penalty case law
Capital punishment in Texas
1993 in United States case law